Mark Marabini (born 7 November 1964 in Harare) is an athlete from Zimbabwe.  He competes in triathlon. He studied at Oriel Boys' High School in Chisipite in Harare.

Marabini competed at the first Olympic triathlon at the 2000 Summer Olympics.  He did not finish the competition.

References

Zimbabwean male triathletes
Triathletes at the 2000 Summer Olympics
Olympic triathletes of Zimbabwe
Living people
1964 births